695 Bella is a minor planet orbiting the Sun.

Although this asteroid has dynamic properties that make it a candidate for the Maria family, the spectral properties of the object indicate it is most likely an interloper. Instead, it may have been spalled off from 6 Hebe or its parent body. 695 Bella and 6 Hebe orbit on opposite sides of the 3:1 Kirkwood gap, and the two have similar orbital elements.

References

External links 
 
 

Maria asteroids
Bella
Bella
S-type asteroids (Tholen)
19091107